Dimitrije Srbu (2 December 1940 – 6 April 2017) was a Yugoslav football player and coach.

Born in Alibunar, in the Danube Banovina, Srbu started playing at FK Vršac before being brought by giants FK Partizan. But after two seasons in Yugoslav capital, he moved to NK Olimpija Ljubljana where he spend 12 years, becoming one of the most capped players of Olimpija in its history.

After retiring, he became a coach and coached the youth team of Olimpija, and later NK Domžale and NK Ljubljana.

He died in Slovenian capital Ljubljana on 3 April 2017.

References

1940 births
2017 deaths
People from Alibunar
Serbian footballers
Serbian people of Romanian descent
Yugoslav footballers
FK Vršac players
FK Partizan players
NK Olimpija Ljubljana (1945–2005) players
Yugoslav First League players
Yugoslav football managers
Association football defenders